Augusta Independent School is a public school in Augusta, Kentucky, United States, for pre-kindergarten through the twelfth grade.  It is the only school in the Augusta Independent Schools school district in Bracken County, Kentucky, founded in 1887.

Athletics
The Augusta Panthers compete in volleyball, cross country, archery, basketball, tennis, golf, baseball and softball.

Notable alumni
 George Clooney, actor

References

External links
 

Schools in Bracken County, Kentucky
Public high schools in Kentucky
Augusta, Kentucky